The tour by the Australian cricket team in England in 1981 included the 51st Ashes series of Test matches between Australia and England. Despite having been 1–0 down after two Tests, England won the next three to finish 3–1 victors (with two draws), thus retaining the Ashes.

Australian squad
Australia's regular captain Greg Chappell made himself unavailable for selection, and Kim Hughes was re-instated. The Australian squad selected for the tour was as follows:
Batsmen – Kim Hughes (captain), Allan Border, Graeme Wood, John Dyson, Graham Yallop, Martin Kent, Dirk Wellham, Trevor Chappell
Fast bowlers – Dennis Lillee, Terry Alderman, Rodney Hogg, Geoff Lawson
Spinners – Ray Bright, Graeme Beard
Wicketkeeper – Rod Marsh, Steve Rixon

Selection controversies
Doug Walters was overlooked despite a strong summer at home. This resulted in protests from fans and Walters' eventual retirement from first class cricket.

Bruce Yardley had been Australia's most successful spinner that summer with 47 wickets, followed by Jim Higgs with 38. The selectors preferred Ray Bright (22 wickets at 40) and Graeme Beard (29 wickets at 25).

Replacements
Mike Whitney was called up as a replacement during the tour.

Test series
Although the two teams were ranked below the mighty West Indies of that era, the 1981 Ashes is nevertheless widely regarded as one of the most entertaining Test series ever due to the see-sawing nature of both the individual games and the series as a whole.

England won the series 3–1 despite being 1–0 down after the first two Tests.

Before the third Test at Headingley, the inspirational Mike Brearley was reinstated as England captain, replacing Ian Botham, whose 12-Test tenure as captain had been winless and whose previously excellent form with both bat and ball had fallen away (he had made a pair in the second Test at Lord's).

The series turned around in the legendary third test at Headingly. A galvanised Botham took 6 for 95 in Australia's first innings and scored 50 in England's, but Australia nonetheless compiled 401 for 9 declared (John Dyson scoring 102) and bowled England out for 174, thus forcing England to follow on 227 runs in arrears. Despite a stubborn 46 from Geoff Boycott, in the second innings Botham came to the crease with England on 105 for 5, still requiring 122 runs to avoid an innings defeat. He played an outstanding innings of 149 not out, sharing partnerships of 117 with Graham Dilley for the eighth wicket, 67 with Chris Old for the ninth and 37 with Bob Willis for the tenth, to set Australia a target of 130. Australia then reached 56 for 1, seemingly well set, before Brearley switched Willis' bowling end to allow him to bowl down the slope. Willis bowled a superb spell of 8 for 43 to dismiss Australia for 111; England became only the second team in Test Match history to win a match after being made to follow-on.

The fourth Test at Edgbaston was a similarly inspired comeback victory for England. England conceded a 69-run first innings deficit, and set Australia a target of only 151 in the fourth innings. Australia reached 105 for 4 before Botham took five for 11, including a spell of five wickets for a solitary run, to end Australia's second innings at 121 and give England victory by 29 runs.

England also went on to win the fifth Test at Old Trafford to retain the Ashes, including another century for Botham (who reached his hundred in 86 balls). Botham scored 118 from 102 balls, dominating a chalk-and-cheese partnership of 149 with Chris Tavaré, who blocked his way to 78 from 289 balls. Botham's innings included 6 sixes, which was an Ashes record until Ben Stokes's innings of 135 at Headingley in the 2019 Ashes series. Second-innings centuries from Allan Border and Graham Yallop could not avert defeat.

The sixth Test at The Oval was drawn, with Dennis Lillee taking 11 wickets in the match and Botham taking 10.

First Test

Second Test

Third Test

Fourth Test

Fifth Test

Sixth Test

One Day Internationals (ODIs)
Three ODIs were played on this tour prior to the Test series. Australia won the Prudential Trophy 2–1, winning at Edgbaston and Headingley, after losing the first match at Lord's.

1st ODI

2nd ODI

3rd ODI

Visit to Sri Lanka
The Australian team visited Sri Lanka in May 1981 en route to England. They played three limited-overs matches and one first-class match against the Sri Lanka national team, which at that time was on the brink of achieving Test status. The first-class match was played at Paikiasothy Saravanamuttu Stadium in Colombo and ended in a draw after being badly affected by the weather.

References

Further reading
 Playfair Cricket Annual 1982
 Wisden Cricketer's Almanack 1982

External links
 334notout.com
 CricketArchive

1981 in Australian cricket
1981 in English cricket
1981 in Sri Lankan cricket
1981
1981
International cricket competitions from 1980–81 to 1985
Sri Lankan cricket seasons from 1972–73 to 1999–2000
1981